Dawson electoral district was a territorial electoral district in the Yukon Territory, Canada, which elected a member to the Yukon Territorial Council. The electoral district was created in 1920 by the merger of the former districts of North Dawson and South Dawson.  The electoral district once reached the far north of Old Crow by the 1970 election, and was redistricted in 1974 election

Representatives

Results

1920 general election

1922 general election

References

External links
Elections Yukon

Former Yukon territorial electoral districts
1920 establishments in Canada